Emboscada (English: Ambush) is the fifth studio album by Puerto Rican singer Vico C released on July 2, 2002 by EMI Latin. Produced by Mr. Funky and described by the artist himsefl as the most complete album with deep lyrics and musical variety. it contains eleven tracks ranging topics such like christianity, redemption social criticism and the explicit lyrics (Violence and Sex) in the latin urban genre and their consequences in society and among the youth audiences. The album incorporates christian rap with elements of alternative reggaeton and tropical house. It includes "El Súper Héroe", released as a bonus track on Vivo (2001) and a new version of the song "La Movida", original from "Con Poder" (1996), which included a sample "He Renuciado de Ti" by Jose Jose. 

Embocada receive positive reviews. It won the Latin Grammy Award for Best Urban Music Album in 2002. Also, it was nominated for Best Urban Album of the Year at Premio Lo Nuestro 2003 and for Latin Rap Album of the Year at the 2003 Latin Billboard Music Awards.Eventually, it peaked at 36 US Top Latin Albums. The album was supported by the release of three official singles: Los Perros, El Super Heroe and the title track that was included on the sound track of the movie Out of Time and peaked at number 40 of US Hot Latin Songs.

Track listing

Charts

References

2002 albums
Vico C albums